The 2015 Columbus Lions season was the ninth season for the indoor football franchise and their fourth in the Professional Indoor Football League (PIFL). They won PIFL Cup IV over the Richmond Raiders.

Schedule
Key:

Regular season
All start times are local to home team

Standings

Postseason

Roster

References

Columbus Lions
Columbus Lions
Columbus Lions